Hirnytske is an urban-type settlement in the Snizhne Municipality, Donetsk Oblast (province) of eastern Ukraine. Population:

Demographics
Native language as of the Ukrainian Census of 2001:
 Ukrainian 7.36%
 Russian 92.64%

References

Urban-type settlements in Horlivka Raion